Erejuwa II was a Nigerian traditional title holder and paramount leader of the Itsekiri who was Olu of Warri from 1951 to 1964 and from 1966 to 1986. He was the 18th Olu of Warri Kingdom with the title Ogiame Erejuwa II. He succeeded his father Ginuwa II as Olu. Ginuwa II was a great grandson of Olu Akengbuwa the last Olu who died in 1848, he was crowned in 1936 after an interregnum that lasted 88 years when Warri's political leadership was dominated by merchant princes.

Erejuwa was born  as Wilson Gbesimi Emiko, he attended a CMS missionary school at Ogbesse, thereafter he did business with United African Company rising to become a provincial cooperatives president. Warri was the capital township of Warri Province, a colonial administrative unit with Warri Division as a sub-unit consisting of Warri Township, Sapele and Forcados. The government decision led to protest led by non-Itsekiri groups within Warri Division who feared the title could lead the Olu to lay claim as paramount authority within Warri Division. The title had always been “the Olu of Warri before it was changed to Olu of Itsekiri in 1936 to passify the Itsekiri neighbours who had always feared Itsekiri domination by their very influential king. But the Itsekiri had used every civilized forum to protest this anomaly until 1952 when the title was reverted to its original status of Olu of Warri.

As Olu of Warri, he was appointed regional Minister without portfolio and president of the Warri Divisional Traditional Council.

Following unhealthy rivalry between prominent Itsekiri leaders in the Action Group and the NCNC in the lead to the creation of a Mid-West region, Erejuwa, who perceived to have backed Action Group, was deposed by the NCNC led regional government in 1964 and deported to Ogbesse. He was re-appointed in 1966 by the new military government of David Ejoor after some of the prominent Itsekiri leaders in the NCNC had been taken out by the emerging military government.

References 

1986 deaths
Nigerian traditional rulers